The Concordia Student Union (usually referred to as the CSU) is the organization representing undergraduate students at Concordia University in Montreal, Quebec, Canada. Its membership totals around 30 people and is elected by students, in recent elections only 4,671 (15.3%) of 30,444 electors voted in the election.

History

Origin
The CSU was originally named the Concordia University Students' Association (CUSA). It was incorporated in 1982 as the Concordia University Students' Association Inc. The name was changed to Concordia Student Union Inc. in 1994 and the "Inc." was dropped from the name in 2002.

Accreditation
In 2001, CSU undertook an accreditation drive, to legally represent all undergraduate students at Concordia, and was successful in its endeavour, though heavily opposed by the accredited faculty undergraduate student associations for Engineering and Commerce.

References

External links
 

Student Union
Quebec students' associations
Students' associations in Canada
Organizations established in 1979
1979 establishments in Quebec